Michaela Marksová (born Michaela Tominová March 20, 1969) is a Czech politician. From January 2014, she was the Czech Minister of Labour and Social Affairs in the government of Bohuslav Sobotka, and the spokesperson on human rights and families, leaving the posts in December 2017 following legislative elections. Since 2006 she has been a council member for the Czech Social Democratic Party in the Prague 2 district council.

She is a niece of the philosopher Julius Tomin and Zdenka Tomin, former Charter 77 speaker.

References 

1969 births
Labour and Social Affairs ministers of the Czech Republic
Living people
Czech Social Democratic Party Government ministers
Charles University alumni
Politicians from Prague